Ivolga means golden oriole in Russian and may refer to
Ivolga archaeological site in Buryatia, Russia
Ivolga monastery in Buryatia, Russia
Ivolga - an electric multiple unit passenger train of TVZ